The Hive is an American 2008 science fiction made-for-television film set in Thailand, directed by Peter Manus and written by T. S. Cook. Starring Tom Wopat, Kal Weber and Mark Ramsey, the film follows a group of scientists who must stop a swarm of man-eating ants feeding on the population, but eventually discover that something was controlling the ants. It is the 8th film of the Maneater Series, it premiered on the Syfy channel on February 17, 2008. The film was released to DVD on August 5, 2008.

Plot

A large swarm of ants arrives on Earth one night, terrorizing many cities and towns. A group of scientists must work together to stop the ants before it is too late.

Cast
 Tom Wopat as Bill
 Kal Weber as Dr. Horace "Len" Lennart
 Elizabeth Healey as Claire Dubois
 Mark Ramsey as Cortez
 Jessica Reavis as Debs
 Elizabeth Bonder as Ying
 Pisek Intarakanchit as Chang
 Nicky Tamrong as Minister Zhing
 Dorrie Salmon as Baby
 Sujinthara Phumjan as Young Mother

References

External links
 
 DVD Talk review

2008 television films
2008 films
2000s science fiction horror films
Films shot in Thailand
Maneater (film series)
Syfy original films
2000s English-language films
2000s American films